is a gymnasium located in Hiroshima, Japan.

Overview
The gymnasium was built in 1989, in memory of Katsutoshi Nekoda, the volleyball setter.  It is the home gymnasium of the JT Thunders, a men's volleyball team in Hiroshima.

See also
 JT Thunders
 Katsutoshi Nekoda

References

Sports venues in Hiroshima
Indoor arenas in Japan